Barodi is a village in Jind sub-district of Jind District in Haryana, India.

References 

Villages in Jind district